Kubbestolen Peak is a bare rock peak,  high, at the northwest end of Vinten-Johansen Ridge in the Kurze Mountains of Queen Maud Land, Antarctica. It was mapped from surveys and air photos by the Sixth Norwegian Antarctic Expedition (1956–60) and named Kubbestolen (the log chair).

References

Mountains of Queen Maud Land
Princess Astrid Coast